Michael A. Sheehan (February 10, 1955 – July 30, 2018) was an American author and former government official and military officer. He was a Distinguished Chair at the U.S. Military Academy in West Point, New York and a terrorist analyst for NBC News.

Education
Born in Red Bank, New Jersey, Sheehan was raised in Hazlet and graduated from Christian Brothers Academy in 1973 and the United States Military Academy (West Point) in 1977. Mr. Sheehan was the son of a school teacher and a civil engineer John and Janet Sheehan, the former  of which also attended the United States Military Academy at West Point. Sheehan has a Master of Science in Foreign Service from the Georgetown University School of Foreign Service as well as one from the United States Army Command and General Staff College.

Military career
He served as an officer in the infantry and Special Forces. He had several overseas assignments, as a commander of a "counter-terrorism" unit in Panama, a counterinsurgency advisor in El Salvador, an infantry company commander in Korea, and on peacekeeping duty in Somalia and Haiti. Also while on active duty, he served in the White House on the National Security Council staff for Presidents George H. W. Bush and Bill Clinton.

Department of State
In 1998, he was appointed Coordinator for Counterterrorism with the rank and status of Ambassador-at-Large at the United States Department of State and was confirmed by the United States Senate for this position in 1999. Following an assignment as Assistant-Secretary-General at the United Nations in the Department of Peacekeeping Operations (2001 to 2003), Sheehan served as Deputy Commissioner of Counter Terrorism for the New York City Police Department until May 2006.

According to General Daniel P. Bolger's book Why We Lost, at an acrimonious meeting in the Clinton White House, Mr. Sheehan asked the members of the Armed Forces present:  "Does Al Qaeda have to hit the Pentagon to get your attention?"

In an interview with a local TV channel, former head of the ISI, General Ziauddin Butt said that US did not intend to capture Osama Bin Laden. General said: "Of the officers US sent to probe for him (Osama Bin Laden), one was a retired major named Sheehan who was extremely unprofessional. At night when we were supposed to discuss the matter, he was so drunk that we had no chance of discussing this matter".

Life after diplomatic service
Sheehan then served as President and co-founder of Lexington Security Group, an international consulting firm that specializes in providing international law enforcement, internal security, and national defense organizations with strategic guidance, unit training, and individual mentoring to manage emerging security challenges.  He was a partner in Torch Hill Investment Partners, a private equity group in New York City that specializes in the defense, intelligence and security sectors. He was also a terrorism analyst for NBC News and a fellow at New York University's Center on Law and Security.

Return to federal service
The White House nominated Sheehan to become Assistant Secretary of Defense for Special Operations and Low Intensity Conflict on November 1, 2011. The U.S. Senate Senate Armed Services Committee held his confirmation hearing on November 17, 2011, and he was confirmed by a voice vote on December 17, 2011.

Death
Sheehan died in Bethesda, Maryland from multiple myeloma on July 30, 2018, aged 63.

Author
Sheehan is the author of the book Crush the Cell:  How to Defeat Terrorism Without Terrorizing Ourselves

References

External links
New York Times, May 6, 2006 – "City to Lose Man Who Led Terror Fight", by William K. Rashbaum
Probe of USS Cole Bombing Unravels Washington Post May 4, 2008

|-

1955 births
2018 deaths
American officials of the United Nations
Christian Brothers Academy (New Jersey) alumni
Deaths from multiple myeloma
Members of the United States Army Special Forces
New York City Police Department officers
People from Hazlet, New Jersey
People from Red Bank, New Jersey
People in counterterrorism
Walsh School of Foreign Service alumni
United States Ambassadors-at-Large
United States Army Command and General Staff College alumni
United States Army officers
United States Assistant Secretaries of Defense
United States Military Academy alumni
Xavier High School (New York City) alumni